Joseph Schmittfranz (July 13, 1892 – July 13, 1932) was an American politician and cheese maker.

Born in Chelsea, Wisconsin, Schmittfranz went to Medford High School. He then took the dairy course at University of Wisconsin. Schmittfranz lived in Thorp, Wisconsin and was a cheese maker. He was president of the Wisconsin Cheese Makers Association. In 1931, Schmittfranz served in the Wisconsin State Assembly and was a Republican. On his fortieth birthday, Schmittfranz was at his brother-in-law's house in Black River Falls, Wisconsin. Schmittfranz was target shooting with his brother-in-law when he picked up a rifle. The rifle discharged sending a bullet into his head killing him. The coroner ruled this to be an accident.

Notes

1892 births
1932 deaths
People from Thorp, Wisconsin
People from Taylor County, Wisconsin
University of Wisconsin–Madison alumni
Deaths by firearm in Wisconsin
20th-century American politicians
Republican Party members of the Wisconsin State Assembly